Blessed Hermann of Reichenau or Herman the Cripple (18 July 1013– 24 September 1054), also known by other names,  was an 11th-century Benedictine monk and scholar. He composed works on history, music theory, mathematics, and astronomy, as well as many hymns. He has traditionally been credited with the composition of "Salve Regina", "Veni Sancte Spiritus", and "Alma Redemptoris Mater",<ref>Handbook of Prayers by James Socías 2006  page 472</ref> although these attributions are sometimes questioned. His cultus and beatification were confirmed by the Roman Catholic Church in 1863.

Names
Hermann's name is sometimes anglicized as Herman or Latinized as Hermannus; it sometimes also appears in the older form Heriman. He is sometimes distinguished as Hermann of Vöhringen from his birthplace. He is better known as Hermann of Reichenau from the location of his monastery on Reichenau Island in Lake Constance.

Life
Hermann was a son of the Count of Altshausen. He was disabled due to a paralytic disease from early childhood. He was born on 18 July 1013 with a cleft palate and cerebral palsy and is said to have had spina bifida. Based on the evidence, however, more recent scholarship indicates Hermann possibly had either amyotrophic lateral sclerosis or spinal muscular atrophy.C Brunhölzl, "Thoughts on the illness of Hermann von Reichenau (1019–1054)", Sudhoffs Arch. 83 (2) (1999), 239-243.  As a result, he had great difficulty moving and could hardly speak.  At seven, he was placed in a Benedictine monastery by his parents who could no longer look after him.

He grew up in the Abbey of Reichenau, an island on Lake Constance in Germany. He learned from the monks and developed a keen interest in both theology and the world around him. At twenty, Hermann entered their order as a Benedictine monk, becoming literate in several languages (including Arabic, Greek and Latin) and contributing to all four arts of the quadrivium.

He wrote about history, mathematics, astronomy, and Christianity. He wrote a treatise on the science of music, several works on geometry and arithmetics, and astronomical treatises including instructions for the construction of an astrolabe which caused him to sometimes be credited as its inventor. As an historian, he wrote a detailed chronicle from the birth of Christ to his own present day, ordering them after the reckoning of the Christian era. It was later extended by his pupil Berthold of Reichenau.

He was a renowned religious poet and musical composer. Among his surviving works are officia for St. Afra and St. Wolfgang. When he went blind in later life, he began writing hymns. He was famous enough that he appears to have been credited with compositions by later writers; among the works traditionally attributed to him are the Salve Regina ("Hail Queen"), Veni Sancte Spiritus ("Come Holy Spirit"), and Alma Redemptoris Mater ("Nourishing Mother of the Redeemer").

Herman died on Reichenau on 24 September 1054, aged 41.  The Roman Catholic Church beatified him in 1863.

Legacy and influence
Three of five symphonies that were written by Russian composer Galina Ustvolskaya are based on his texts.

See also
List of Roman Catholic scientist-clerics

References

Further reading
 McCarthy, T. J. H. Music, scholasticism and reform: Salian Germany, 1024–1125 (Manchester, 2009), pp. 23–30, 62–71. .
 The Musica of Hermannus Contractus. Edited and translated by Leonard Ellinwood. Revised with a new introduction by John L. Snyder'' (Rochester, NY: University of Rochester Press, 2015), xviii + 221 pp.

External links

Catholic Encyclopedia
Hermannus Contractus German language site with a collection of original texts
Catholic Forum
 musicologie.org Hermannus Contractus et la théorie de la musique. Sources, éditions, bibliographie, commentaires

1013 births
1054 deaths
11th-century astrologers
11th-century composers
11th-century German historians
11th-century mathematicians
11th-century astronomers
11th-century Latin writers
11th-century Christian monks
11th-century German poets
People from Altshausen
Musicians from Baden-Württemberg
Scientists from Baden-Württemberg
Medieval German mathematicians
German beatified people
German chroniclers
German music theorists
German people with disabilities
German Christians
Catholic clergy scientists
German Benedictines
Tonaries
German classical composers
German male classical composers
Medieval male composers
Medieval German astronomers
People with spinal muscular atrophy
People with speech impediment
Blind musicians
German blind people
German Christian hymnwriters
Scientists with disabilities